This is a list of indoor arenas in the Philippines.

Arenas used for professional and collegiate sports and used for entertainment
Arenas that are included in this list are venues for basketball (PBA, PBA D-League, ABL), volleyball (PSL, Premier Volleyball League) and boxing. Collegiate sports (like the NCAA, UAAP and CESAFI) include basketball, volleyball, contact sports (judo and taekwondo), and cheerdance competitions. It also includes arenas used for entertainment events including concerts and musical performances, anniversary shows, and professional wrestling shows. Only arenas which has a capacity of 2,000 or more that has hosted at least one of the events previously mentioned are included in this list.

Metro Manila

On-campus arenas

Provincial arenas

Future arenas

See also
List of football stadiums in the Philippines
List of baseball stadiums in the Philippines
List of long course swimming pools in the Philippines

References

Indoor arenas in the Philippines
Philippines
Indoor arenas